Michael Charles Costin (born 10 July 1929, in Hendon) was, together with Keith Duckworth, the co-founder of Cosworth Engineering, a producer of Ford-funded and sponsored engines. Drivers including Graham Hill, Jackie Stewart, Jochen Rindt, Emerson Fittipaldi, James Hunt, Mario Andretti, Alan Jones, Nelson Piquet, and Keke Rosberg won the Formula One World Championship using Cosworth DFV engines during the 1960s, 1970s and 1980s.

He was educated at Salvatorian College in Wealdstone and then apprenticed at De Havilland. In 1953 he started at Lotus, initially helping out on a part-time basis. Keith Duckworth joined Lotus in 1957 and they founded Cosworth Engineering in 1958. He later described himself as having "studied for 40 years at the University of Duckworth".

In recent years he has been a consultant to the revived Triumph motorbike company.

Mike Costin is the younger brother of Frank Costin, an aerodynamics and race car designer for Lotus, Lister and Maserati, and co-founder of Marcos Cars.

References

Further reading
 

British automotive engineers
Formula One engine engineers
Possibly living people
1929 births